Puerto Rico competed in the Summer Olympic Games for the first time at the 1948 Summer Olympics in London, Great Britain. Nine competitors, all men, took part in eight events in three sports.

Medalists

Athletics

Track events

Field events

Legend: 
NP = Notable Performance
Q = Qualified for Finals

Boxing

Legend: 
PTS = Points
RSC = Referee Stop Contest
R = Round

Shooting

Rifle

Pistol

References

External links
Official Olympic Reports
International Olympic Committee results database

Nations at the 1948 Summer Olympics
1948 Summer Olympics
1948 in Puerto Rican sports